Fairy Glen  is a protected area in the Higland, Scotland.

Features 

The reserve protects a belt of semi-natural woodland, with predominating broad-leaved trees, stretching at both sides of the Markie Burn, a stream tributary of the Moray Firth. The valley is narrow and steep-sided, and supports a variety of plants and local birds. The wood management usually operates on non intervention basis, besides removal of invasive species and, when necessary, some tree safety interventions.

Wildlife 
Among the birds living in the nature reserve are:
 Spotted flycatcher
 Long-tailed tit
 Bullfinch
 Buzzards
 Song thrush

Folklore 

The Glen is connected to some ancient costoms. Children of nearby villages used to cast flowers petals in the burn, in order to encourage the fairies to provide fresh water to their hamlets.
A peculiar sight in the Fairy Glen are some old logs known as Money trees, bearing hundreds of coins hammered into their wood, traditionally considered gifts to the fairies. Nowadays the management of the nature reserve discourages this habit, because of the pollution produced by metal corrosion and oxidation.

Access 

A footpath follows the small river from its mouth in Rosemarkie beach flanking two pleasant waterfalls and, after the uppermost of them, ends up in a tiny road which runs on the left side of the glen. A car park is available close to the beginning of the walk. Some part of the footpath are steep and can become slippery with rainy weather; dogs can access the walk but have to be conducted on short leads from April to August, because of the disrurbance they can cause to wildlife.

References

See also 

 List of RSPB reserves

Wood of Cree
Wood of Cree
Protected areas of Highland (council area)